Harry Perry (2 December 1934 – 22 January 2021) was a member of the 1956 and 1960 Irish Olympic boxing teams.  He also competed in the European Amateur Boxing Championships in 1955 and 1959 winning the bronze medal in the welterweight division in 1959.  He was inducted into the Irish Boxing Hall of Fame in 2007.

He died in January 2021, aged 86.

References

See also
Boxing at the 1956 Summer Olympics
Boxing at the 1960 Summer Olympics

1934 births
2021 deaths
Boxers at the 1956 Summer Olympics
Boxers at the 1960 Summer Olympics
Olympic boxers of Ireland
Irish male boxers
Welterweight boxers